Akhil is a masculine given name of Indian origin.

Akhil may also refer to:

Notable person 
Akhil Amar (born 1958), American legal scholar
Akhil Datta-Gupta (born 1961), Indian petroleum engineer
Akhil Gogoi (born 1976), Indian political activist
Akhil Gupta (born 1959), Indian anthropologist
Akhil Kumar (born 1981), Indian boxer
Akhil Mehta (1987–2015), Indian businessman
Akhil Rabindra (born 1996), Indian racing driver
Akhil Sharma (born 1971), Indian writer
Akhileshwar Padala , Software Engineer 
Akhil (singer) (born 1990), Indian actor, singer, and songwriter

Film
 Akhil (film), a 2015 Indian Telugu-language film

See also
 Akilan (1922–1998), a Tamil author
 Akhila (disambiguation), the feminine equivalent of Akhil